Songs from a Bad Hat is the 2001 album by Belgian
rock band Mauro.

Track listing

Chart positions

Singles

Personnel
Mauro Pawlowski: vocals, guitars
Jan Wygers: bass guitar
Anton Janssens: keyboards, backing vocals
Herman Houbrechts: drums, backing vocals

Additional personnel:
"Everybody's friend"
Carol van Dyk: vocals
John Schmersal: organ
Simon & Buni Lenski: strings
"She sits at home" and "Ballad with one arm"
Jane Scarpantoni: strings
"Finish it all off (with love)"
D. Sardy: slide guitar
"Can't fight it no longer"
D. Sardy, Mauro Pawlowski: bones

References

2001 albums
Albums produced by Dave Sardy